Khalifa Ababacar (born 7 July 1989) is a Qatari professional footballer of Senegalese descent who plays as a goalkeeper for Umm Salal.

References

External links
 

Qatari footballers
Qatar international footballers
1989 births
Living people
Al Kharaitiyat SC players
El Jaish SC players
Al-Duhail SC players
Al-Khor SC players
Al-Sailiya SC players
Umm Salal SC players
Place of birth missing (living people)
Naturalised citizens of Qatar
Qatari people of Senegalese descent
Qatar Stars League players
Association football goalkeepers